
Dingyuan may refer to:

 Chinese turret ship Dingyuan, a Qing dynasty turret ship

Places in China
 Dingyuan County, a county in Chuzhou, Anhui
 Dingyuan, Gansu, a town in Yuzhong County, Gansu

Townships
 Dingyuan Township, Henan, in Luoshan County, Henan
 Dingyuan Township, Qu County, in Qu County, Sichuan
 Dingyuan Township, Zitong County, in Zitong County, Sichuan

See also
 Ding Yuan (died 189), warlord during the Han dynasty